Alivereti Veitokani (born 2 November 1992) is Fijian Rugby Union player.  He previously played for the Fiji national rugby sevens team and the Fijian Drua in the Australian domestic National Rugby Championship where he won the 2018 Rising Star Award.

Awards 
 2018 Fiji Sportsman of the Year Award
 2018 NRC Rising Star Award
 Paddy Irish Man of the Match Award against Coventry

References

External links
 

1992 births
Living people
Fijian rugby union players
London Irish players
Fiji national rugby league team players
Fiji international rugby union players
Fijian Drua players
Rugby union fly-halves
Rugby union fullbacks